is an entry in the Metal Max series (besides the Metal Saga series). It is a Japanese open world, nonlinear, vehicle combat role-playing video game published by Kadokawa Games for Nintendo 3DS on 7 November 2013. The game was developed by Cattle Call and 24Frame. Animation produced by Studio 4°C. Famitsu awarded game a 35/40.

Synopsis 
The story took place 50 years after the destruction of human civilizations by mad supercomputer Noah. The protagonist (default name "Hinata") is a young boy who is living peacefully with his foster sister Sasha and foster father Gib in desert islands. One day, a group of mysterious army attacked their island. The protagonist and Sasha escaped but Gib get abducted.

Sasha tells the protagonist that Gib and him were "Hot Seeds". The project of sealing human survivors in hibernation chambers since 50 years ago, in order to preserve mankind and restore the human civilization after the "Great Destruction". Sasha reveals herself to be an android tasked to protect both Gib and the protagonist.

The motivation of the villains to catch Gib is to unseal the ultimate weapon "Black Mole" (クロモグラ), an "indestructible" mobile fortress was created to fight against Noah, and Gib was one of the creators of it. Therefore, the protagonist have to save Gib to prevent the villains to lay hands on the "Black Mole".

References

External links 

 

2013 video games
Cattle Call (company) games
Japan-exclusive video games
Kadokawa Shoten games
4 Gekko no Diva
Nintendo 3DS eShop games
Nintendo 3DS games
Nintendo 3DS-only games
Nintendo Network games
Role-playing video games
Single-player video games
Studio 4°C
Video games developed in Japan
Video games scored by Satoshi Kadokura